A list of prominent tourist attractions in York, England.

City centre
Assembly Rooms, a grand Palladian public space designed by Lord Burlington, 1731–32, lies behind a rebuilt 19th century facade.
Bar Convent Museum
Barley Hall run by York Archaeological Trust (YAT)
Bettys, tea rooms in St Helen's Square
Black Swan, pub in Peasholme Green
Blue Bell, pub in Fossgate
City Walls and gateways (Bars)
Bootham Bar
Micklegate Bar, with the City Walls Experience (YAT) 
Monk Bar
Walmgate Bar
DIG: an archaeological adventure (formerly the Archaeological Resource Centre), in St Saviour's Church (YAT)
Fairfax House, a Georgian house run by York Civic Trust
JORVIK Viking Centre (YAT)
The King's Manor, now part of the University of York
The Mansion House, the Georgian house of York's Lord Mayors
Medieval churches of York including:
All Saints' Church, North Street
Holy Trinity Church, Micklegate
St Denys's Church, Walmgate
St. Michael le Belfrey, where Guy Fawkes was baptised
St Olave's Church, Marygate
Merchant Adventurers' Hall
Merchant Taylors' Hall
Museum Gardens (YMT)
St Mary's Abbey, ruins in the Museum Gardens (YMT)
Yorkshire Museum (YMT)
National Centre for Early Music, in the medieval Church of St Margaret and home of the York Early Music Festival
National Railway Museum
River Ouse, with boat rides and crossed by several bridges
St George's York
The Shambles, York's best-preserved medieval street
The Snickelways, a collection of narrow streets and passages
Treasurer's House (NT)
York Castle
Clifford's Tower (EH)
York Castle Museum (YMT)
York City Art Gallery (YMT)
York Dungeon
York Minster
York's Chocolate Story

Outside York city centre
 Askham Bog
 Askham Bryan Hall
 Bishopthorpe Palace, home to the Archbishop of York
 Elvington Hall
 Goddards House and Garden (NT)
 Heslington Hall
 Holgate Windmill
 Lamel Hill
 Middlethorpe Hall, Middlethorpe Manor
 Osbaldwick Hall
 Skelton Hall, Skelton Manor
 Strays of York
 Vale of York
 York Cemetery
 York Cold War Bunker (EH)
 York Racecourse, situated on Knavesmire
 Yorkshire Air Museum, Elvington
 Yorkshire Museum of Farming, Murton

Notes

 
Sites of interest